The 2001 European Individual Speedway Junior Championship was the fourth edition of the Championship.

Qualification
Semi-Final A:
May 20, 2001
 Motala
Semi-Final B:
June 10, 2001
 Rivne
Semi-Final C:
June 17, 2001
 Diedenbergen

Final
5  or October 6, 2001 (?)
 Pardubice

References

2001
Euro I J